Sitting Eagle, also known as John Hunter, was the chief of the Stoney Nakoda First Nation of Alberta, located in the town of Morley which is home to the Chiniki, Bearspaw, and Wesley bands of Nakoda. Chief Sitting Eagle was born in 1874 and became heavily involved in the Calgary Stampede, over the years coming to be considered a symbol of the event himself. He died in 1970. In 1988, an 11-foot statue of Chief Sitting Eagle was unveiled in downtown Calgary, where it stands to this day.

References

First Nations in Alberta
1970 deaths